Jordan Laws is an American record producer, recording artist, and DJ. He has produced pop culture mashups, combining elements of music, film and television, and is an international performer. As a recording artist, he's served as a vocalist and songwriter, with two solo singles to his credit.

Career
Born in New York City, Laws began his career as a DJ and production assistant.  He worked as a member of the production team for Christina Aguilera's Grammy Award-winning Back to Basics album and on her single, "Ain't No Other Man".

Best known as an international DJ and record producer, Laws began in 2007 as the DJ and producer of Dwyane Wade's "All In" Converse ad campaign, which included music by Rick Ross and was directed by Little X. In 2008, Laws was the DJ for Kim Kardashian's Stoli Hotel tours. He was the guest DJ at the Producer Guild of America's 2011 DIGITAL 25: Leaders in Emerging Entertainment Awards and has been the official DJ for the Lenovo Consumer Electronics Show since 2013. Laws headlined South by Southwest in 2013.

Laws’ video work includes video mashups produced while with a video collective, Screenwerks, most notably Movie Line Rhymes, garnering attention from The Huffington Post, CBS News and the Today Show. Laws produced the Best of: Ultra 2011 Music Videos for Ultra Records, featuring artists including Steve Aoki, Above & Beyond, Wolfgang Gartner, Calvin Harris, Benny Benassi, Skrillex, and Will.i.am.

In 2020 Laws worked on the Bernie Sanders 2020 presidential campaign.

Discography and videography

References

External links
 Jordan Laws on All Music Credits

Year of birth missing (living people)
Living people
American male singers
Record producers from New York (state)
Songwriters from New York (state)
American audio engineers
American male songwriters